Lucien Renard was a Belgian cyclist. He competed in the 660 yards sprint at the 1908 Summer Olympics.

References

External links
 

Year of birth missing
Year of death missing
Belgian male cyclists
Olympic cyclists of Belgium
Cyclists at the 1908 Summer Olympics
Place of birth missing